Igor Andreev and Evgeny Donskoy were the defending champions but Andreev decided not to participate.
Donskoy played alongside Dmitry Tursunov.
Johan Brunström and Raven Klaasen won the title, defeating Philipp Marx and Florin Mergea 7–6(7–2), 6–7(5–7), [10–5] in the final.

Seeds

Draw

Draw

References

External links
 Main Draw

Geneva Open Challenger - Doubles
2012 Doubles